Sandi is a unisex given name and occasionally a nickname. It can be a short form of Sandra, Alexander and other names. It may refer to:

People

Women
Sandi Bogle, 21st century English television personality born Sandy Channer
Sandi Bowen (born 1976), Australian volleyball player
Sandi Freeman, American journalist
Sandi Goldsberry (born 1955), American high jumper
Sandi Griffiths (born 1946), American singer best known as a performer on The Lawrence Welk Show
Sandi A. Hohn (born 1952), Japanese singer
Sandra "Sandi" Jackson (born 1963), American politician, daughter-in-law of Jesse Jackson
Sandi Morris (born 1992), American pole vaulter
Sandra "Sandi" Patty (born 1956), American Christian music singer
Sandi Peterson (born 1959), American businesswoman
Barbara Robison (1945–1988), American rock singer
Sandra "Sandi" Sissel (born 1949), American cinematographer and director
Sandi Sweitzer (born 1946), American former pairs figure skater
Alexandria "Sandi" Thom (born 1981), Scottish singer, songwriter and musician
Sandra "Sandi" Toksvig (born 1958), Danish-born English comedian, author and presenter on radio and television
Sandi Vito, 21st century American politician

Men
Sandi Čebular (born 1986), Slovenian basketball player
Sandi Čeh (born 1983), Slovenian footballer
Aleksandar "Sandi" Cenov (born 1968), Croatian pop singer
Alexander "Sandi" Čolnik (1937–2017), Slovene journalist, television presenter and writer
Sandi Simcha DuBowski (born 1970), American film director and producer
Sandi Klavžar (born 1962), Slovenian mathematician
Sandi Križman (born 1989), Croatian footballer
Aleksander "Sandi" Lah, Slovenian football player in the 1930s
Sandi Lovrić (born 1998), Slovenian footballer
Sandi Ogrinec (born 1998), Slovenian footballer
Sandi Papež (born 1965), Yugoslav cyclist
Sandi Sejdinovski, Slovenian football coach
Sandi Darma Sute (born 1992), Indonesian footballer
Alexander "Sandy" Thom (1894–1985), Scottish engineer
Sandi Valentinčič (born 1967), Slovenian football player

Fictional characters
Sandi Brandenberg, Marvel Comics character
Sandi Griffin, character in Daria

See also
Sandy (given name)

English feminine given names
English-language unisex given names
Slovene given names
Unisex given names
Hypocorisms